Austin Executive Airport  is a public-use airport in Travis County, 14 miles northeast of Austin, immediately southeast of Pflugerville and north of Manor. It was known as Bird's Nest Airport (FAA: 6R4) until 2011.

Many U.S. airports use the same three-letter location identifier for the FAA and IATA, but this facility is EDC to the FAA and has no IATA code.

History
Austin Executive Airport opened in 2011 with funding from Ron Henriksen, who also operates Houston Executive Airport. In February 2013, the new Runway 13/31 was awarded the 2012 Ray Brown Airport Pavement Award by the National Asphalt Pavement Association, recognizing it as the highest quality airport asphalt pavement project in the country.

A different airport with a similar name was the Austin Executive Airpark (FAA: 3R3), near Parmer Lane and Interstate 35. Named Tim's Airpark in the 1960s and 1970s, it closed on May 1, 1999.

Facilities
It has two asphalt runways: 13/31 is 6,025 by 100 feet (1,836 x 30 m) and 16/34 is 1,550 by 25 feet (472 x 8 m).

In 2013 the airport had 18,000 general aviation aircraft operations, average 1,500 per month. 93 aircraft were then based at this airport.

References

External links 
 Official website for Austin Executive Airport
 Aerial photo as of 28 January 1995 from USGS The National Map
 
 

Airports in Texas
Transportation in Austin, Texas
Transportation in Travis County, Texas
Buildings and structures in Travis County, Texas
Airports in Greater Austin